Lacrymaria lacrymabunda is a species of fungus in the family Psathyrellaceae. It is found in North America, Central America, Europe, northern Asia, and New Zealand, where it grows on disturbed ground in woodland, gardens, and parks. Although it is sometimes listed as an edible species, some individuals report developing stomach upset after eating it.

It has jet black, heavily ornamented spores and a fragile, brittle consistency.

References

External links

Fungi described in 1785
Fungi of Asia
Fungi of Central America
Fungi of Europe
Fungi of North America
Fungi of New Zealand
Psathyrellaceae
Taxa named by Jean Baptiste François Pierre Bulliard